El Feidja National Park is located in Northwest Tunisia and has an area of . It is home to many animals, notably, Barbary stag, African golden wolf, and Barbary boar.

El Feidja offers a beautiful landscape, with an abundance of forests, mountains, natural springs and lakes, where many endangered species have been preserved.

This area is very important as an archaeological site.

The IUCN classifies this park as Category II.

References

UNESCO

National parks of Tunisia
Protected areas established in 1980